Sir Willem Boreel, 1st Baronet (2 March 1591 in Middelburg – 29 September 1668 in Paris) was a Dutch diplomat.

Biography
Willem Boreel was the son of Jacob Boreel (1552-1636), burgomaster of Bergen-op-Zoom. Adam Boreel and the jurist Abraham Boreel were brothers; Johan Boreel was a half-brother. From 1618 Boreel worked for the Dutch East India Company as a lawyer, and was part of a mission to resolve the Dutch and British commercial rivalry in the East Indies by a treaty. He was knighted by James I of England. 

Boreel became Baron of Vreendijk and Vreenhove. From 1627 to 1649 he was Pensionary of Amsterdam. During that period he travelled to England, with Johan van Reede van Renswouden, in an attempt to mediate in the First English Civil War. Then from 1650 for the rest of his life he served as Ambassador of the Dutch Republic to France.

Telescope investigation
In 1655 Boreel assisted in the controversy over trying to figure out who invented the telescope. He had a local magistrate in Middelburg in the Netherlands follow up on his recollection of a spectacle maker who told Boreel in 1610 about inventing the telescope. The magistrate was contacted by a then unknown claimant, Middelburg spectacle maker Johannes Zachariassen, who testified that his father, Zacharias Janssen invented the telescope and the microscope as early as 1590. This testimony seemed to convincing to Boreel, who now recollected that Zacharias must have been who he remembered. Boreel's conclusion that Zacharias Janssen invented the telescope a little ahead of another spectacle maker, Hans Lippershey, was adopted by Pierre Borel in his 1656 book on the subject.

Notes

1591 births
1668 deaths
Expatriates of the Dutch Republic in France
17th-century Dutch lawyers
Dutch nobility
People from Middelburg, Zeeland
Baronets in the Baronetage of England